Loxolomia is a genus of moths in the family Saturniidae first described by Peter Maassen in 1869.

Species
Loxolomia johnsoni Schaus, 1932
Loxolomia serpentina Maassen, 1869
Loxolomia winbrechlini Brechlin & Meister, 2013

References

Arsenurinae